Düsseldorf-Eller Süd station is located approximately 5 kilometres south of Düsseldorf Hauptbahnhof in the district of Eller in the city of Düsseldorf in the German state of North Rhine-Westphalia. It is on the Cologne–Duisburg line and is classified by Deutsche Bahn as a category 5 station.  It is served by Rhine-Ruhr S-Bahn lines S 6 every 20 minutes and by a few services of S 68 in the peak hour.

Location 

The station is located between the districts of Düsseldorf-Wersten, Düsseldorf-Eller, and Dusseldorf-Oberbilk. It has a central island platform and is elevated above the Karlsruher Straße, on which its entrance is located. A second entrance is located on the underpass between the streets of Sturmstraße and Konradstraße.

Services 

Currently, the station is served by two S-Bahn lines and four bus lines.

References

Footnotes

Sources

 
 

Rhine-Ruhr S-Bahn stations
Railway stations in Düsseldorf
S6 (Rhine-Ruhr S-Bahn)
S68 (Rhine-Ruhr S-Bahn)
Railway stations in Germany opened in 1967